This article presents the filmography of Mexican actress Elsa Cárdenas. She has appeared in more than 100 films throughout her career.

Films

Television shows

See also
 Elsa Cárdenas

References

External links

Actress filmographies
Mexican filmographies